A partial solar eclipse occurred on 25 November, 2011. A solar eclipse occurs when the Moon passes between Earth and the Sun, thereby totally or partly obscuring the image of the Sun for a viewer on Earth. A partial solar eclipse occurs in the polar regions of the Earth when the center of the Moon's shadow misses the Earth.

This eclipse was visible across Antarctica in its summer 24-hour day sunlight, and New Zealand at sunset with less than 20% of the Sun obscured. Parts of the western Antarctic Peninsula experienced nearly 90% obscuration of the Sun, while South Africa and Tasmania experienced a very small partial eclipse. The eclipse belonged to Saros 123 and was number 53 of 70 eclipses in the series.

This was the last of four partial solar eclipses in 2011, with the others occurring on January 4, 2011, June 1, 2011, and July 1, 2011.

Images 
Animated path

Related eclipses

Eclipses of 2011 
 A partial solar eclipse on January 4.
 A partial solar eclipse on June 1.
 A total lunar eclipse on June 15.
 A partial solar eclipse on July 1.
 A partial solar eclipse on November 25.
 A total lunar eclipse on December 10.

It proceeded the total lunar eclipse which occurred on December 10, 2011.

Solar eclipses 2011–2014

Metonic series

Notes

References

 APOD December 2, 2011 
 http://eclipse.gsfc.nasa.gov/SEplot/SEplot2001/SE2011Nov25P.GIF
 www.space.com: Solar Eclipse Wows Lucky Skywatchers in New Zealand

2011 11 25
2011 in science
2011 11 25
November 2011 events